Erich Arndt (26 August 1911 – 6 March 1961) was a German cyclist. He competed in the team pursuit event at the 1936 Summer Olympics.

References

External links
 

1911 births
1961 deaths
German male cyclists
Olympic cyclists of Germany
Cyclists at the 1936 Summer Olympics
Sportspeople from Krefeld
Cyclists from North Rhine-Westphalia
20th-century German people